Check Out the Groove is the debut album by British dance group Undercover, released in 1992.

Single releases
A cover version of "Baker Street", originally performed by Gerry Rafferty, was the first single released from the album. This reached number 2 in the UK Singles Chart and the top 10 of many other countries around Europe. "Never Let Her Slip Away", originally by Andrew Gold, was the second single, reaching number 5 in the UK as well as the top 10 of several other European charts. "I Wanna Stay with You", originally by Gallagher and Lyle, was the third single released from the album, reaching number 28 in the UK as well as charting in several other European countries.

Track listing

Personnel
Adapted from the album's liner notes.

Musicians
Undercover
John Matthews – vocals, backing vocals
Steve Mac – keyboards, backing vocals
Jon Jules – bass guitar

Additional musicians
Tracy Ackerman – backing vocals
Guy Barker – trumpet
Joe Becket – percussion
Chris Laws – drums
Tim Laws – guitar
Phil Todd – saxophone
Nigel Wright – trombone

Production
Produced by Steve Mac
Sleeve design: David Howells
Photography: Mike Smallcombe, assisted by Debs & Peter Sherrard
Styling: Shazza
Makeup: Katya Thomas

Charts

References

External links
Check Out the Groove at Discogs

1992 debut albums
Albums produced by Steve Mac
Pete Waterman Entertainment albums